Several genera of the Lithosiini tribe of lichen moths are placed as incertae sedis due to the uncertainty of their phylogenetic relationships within the tribe.

Genera
The following genera are not classified in a subtribe.

Abrochocis
Acanthofrontia
Achroosia
Adoxosia
Adrepsa
Aeolosia
Aethosia
Agkonia
Aglossosia
Aglossosia
Agrisius
Agylloides
Alepista
Amalodeta
Ameleta
Amplicincia
Anaemosia
Anaene
Anaphleps
Anaphosia
Anaulosia
Anestia
Antona
Apogurea
Apothosia
Aptilosia
Archilema
Archithosia
Ardonea
Ardonissa
Areva
Arhabdosia
Arrhythmica
Ascaptesyle
Astacosia
Asurgylla
Asuridoides
Asythosia
Atelophleps
Ateucheta
Avela
Balbura
Barsinella
Birgorima
Bitecta
Blabioides
Blavia
Boenasa
Brachiosia
Bryantia
Brycea
Callisthenia
Carcinopodia
Carilephia
Castronia
Castulo
Chionosia
Chlorogenia
Chrysaeglia
Chrysaegliodes
Chrysochlorosia
Chrysozana
Cincia
Clemendana
Cloesia
Comachara
Conilepia
Costarcha
Cragia
Cristulosia
Ctenosia
Cybosia
Cyclosticta
Darantasiella
Deloplotela
Deua
Diadesmola
Diarhabdosia
Didymonyx
Dipaenae
Disaulota
Disoidemata
Dixanaene
Dohertya
Dolichesia
Dotha
Epeiromulona
Epitalara
Euclemensoides
Eudoliche
Eugonosia
Eugraphosia
Euproctosia
Eurozonosia
Eurylomia
Eurynora
Eutelesia
Euthyone
Euzeugapteryx
Exilisia
Fabresema
Gaudeator
Geridixis
Geriojennsa
Glaucosia
Goniosema
Grucia
Gylla
Halone
Halurgia
Hanoisiella
Hassleria
Hectobrocha
Heliorabdia
Hemipsilia
Hestiarcha
Hesychopa
Heterotropa
Hobapromea
Holochrea
Hypagoptera
Hypareva
Hypasura
Hypermaepha
Hyperthagylla
Hypeugoa
Idopterum
Ionthas
Isorropus
Lacydoides
Lamprosiella
Lamprostola
Lepidilema
Lepista
Lepista
Leptopepla
Leucorhodia
Lithoprocris
Lobilema
Lomuna
Lymantriopsis
Lysceia
Machairophora
Macroptila
Macrosia
Mahensia
Marsypophora
Megalobosia
Melastrota
Meneclia
Metagylla
Metallosia
Metalobosia
Metareva
Meterythrosia
Meteura
Metexilisia
Micrilema
Microhyle
Micrommia
Microstola
Miltasura
Mintopola
Mulona
Muxta
Nanna
Neagylla
Neardonaea
Neasuroides
Nelo
Neoduma
Neomulona
Neoplynes
Neosiccia
Neotalara
Neothyone
Neozana
Nephelosia
Nesiotica
Nilgiricola
Nipponasura
Nodozana
Nolinophanes
Novosia
Nudina
Nudosia
Nudur
Nyctochroa
Nyctosia
Ochrota
Odozana
Oedaleosia 
Onychipodia 
Onymapata
Oreopola
Ovenna
Ovipennis
Pachasura
Pachycerosia
Pagara
Palaeosiccia
Palaeozana
Panachranta
Parabitecta
Paracincia
Paradoxosia
Paragylla
Paramulona
Paraonagylla
Parapalosia
Parascolia
Parashada
Parasiccia
Paratalara
Paratype
Parelictis
Paremonia
Pareugoa
Parexilisia
Parvicincia
Parvicincia
Pasteosia
Paulianosia
Phaeophlebosia
Phaeosia
Phaulosia
Phenacomorpha
Philenora
Phryganopsis
Physetocneme
Pliniola
Plumareola
Poliodule
Prepiella
Procridia
Procrimima
Progona
Prolobosia
Pronola
Proxhyle
Pseudlepista
Pseudomacroptila
Pseudophanes
Pusiola
Ranghana
Rhagophanes
Rhodographa
Saozana
Scaphidriotis
Serincia
Seripha
Sicciaemorpha
Siculifer
Sidyma
Siopastea
Snellenopsis
Snellenopsis
Spatulosia
Spatulosia
Stenarcha
Stenaulis
Stenaulis
Stenilema
Stenopterosia
Stenosia
Sterrhosia
Sylescaptia
Symmetrodes
Syntomimorpha
Talara
Tampea
Termessa
Tesma
Thallarcha
Thermeola
Threnosia
Tineopsis
Tmetoptera
Tospitis
Trichareva
Trissobrocha
Tropacme
Tuina
Turlinia
Urozana
Vianania
Viettesia
Vulmara
Xantholopha
Yelva
Zadadrina

References

Lithosiini
Lepidoptera incertae sedis